is a railway station in the town of Nishiwaga, Iwate Prefecture, Japan, operated by East Japan Railway Company (JR East).

Lines
Hottoyuda Station is served by the Kitakami Line, and is located 35.2 km from the terminus of the line at Kitakami Station.

Station layout
The station has a side platform and an island platform connected to the station building by a level crossing. The platforms serve three tracks, only two tracks are used during regular service (one track per platform). The station building is located southeast of the platforms. There is no direct station access from the north side, but an overpass connects the station building to the area north of the station. The station has a Midori no Madoguchi ticket office.

Platforms

History
It was absorbed into the JR East network upon the privatization of the Japanese National Railways (JNR) on April 1, 1987. A new station building was completed in April 1989, and rebuilt in January 1995. The station was renamed Hottoyuda Station on June 20, 1991.

Passenger statistics
In fiscal 2018, the station was used by an average of 120 passengers daily (boarding passengers only).

Surrounding area
 
Kawajiri Post Office
Yuda Onsen

See also
 List of railway stations in Japan

References

External links

 

Railway stations in Iwate Prefecture
Kitakami Line
Railway stations in Japan opened in 1922
Nishiwaga, Iwate
Stations of East Japan Railway Company